Elisha Cooke (September 16, 1637 – October 31, 1715) was a wealthy Massachusetts physician, politician, and businessman who was elected Speaker of the Massachusetts Bay Assembly in 1683. He was the leader of the "popular party", a faction in the Massachusetts House that resisted encroachment by royal officials on colonial rights embodied in the Massachusetts Charter. This role was taken up by his son, Elisha Cooke Jr.

Life
Cooke was born in Boston, the son of Richard and Elizabeth Cook, from Gloucestershire, England. He graduated from Harvard College in 1657 at age 20, in a class of seven students. Cooke was trained and practiced as a physician, but he also became a politician. He was made freeman in 1673. He was elected to the colonial assembly representing Boston in 1681, serving until 1683. Cooke was elected to the commission of counsellors in May 1693; however, Governor Sir William Phips refused to ratify the choice, to exact revenge on Cooke's having opposed his appointment as chief magistrate. In 1695 Cooke was appointed Judge of the Superior Court, taking the place of John Richards, who had died, and in 1701 he became Judge of Probate.

Cooke was a confidential adviser of Lord Bellomont, who became Governor of Massachusetts in 1699. He lost his judicial appointments in 1702 when Joseph Dudley became governor; Dudley took revenge on Cooke for being a member of the council which had committed him to prison in 1689.  This had occurred after the 1689 Boston revolt, which deposed Sir Edmund Andros, governor of the Dominion of New England, and other officials (including Dudley).  Cooke served on the rebel council that took power after the dominion's overthrow.

Cooke married Elizabeth Leverett, the daughter of Governor John Leverett in June 1668. They had one son, Elisha Jr., who was born on December 20, 1678. Elizabeth died on July 21, 1715, and Cooke died shortly thereafter on October 31, 1715.

References

1637 births
1715 deaths
Harvard College alumni
Members of the colonial Massachusetts House of Representatives
Members of the colonial Massachusetts Governor's Council
Justices of the Massachusetts Superior Court of Judicature
People from colonial Boston
18th-century American physicians
Speakers of the Massachusetts House of Representatives
17th-century English medical doctors